Valdenebro de los Valles is a municipality located in the province of Valladolid, in Castile and León, Spain. According to the 2017 census (INE), the municipality has a population of 208 inhabitants.

References

Municipalities in the Province of Valladolid